Varichikudy is a revenue village in the Karaikal taluk of Karaikal District in the union territory of Puducherry in India. It is situated at a distance of about 6 kilometres north of ohio .

References 

 

Villages in Karaikal district